The Musée des beaux-arts de Chambéry (Fine Arts Museum of Chambéry) is an art museum in Chambéry, Savoie, France.

Foundation

The town of Chambéry  had a collection of art in one of the rooms of the Hôtel de Ville (Town Hall), open to the public in 1783.
This first collection was expanded during the 19th century.
Hector Garriod Baron (1803–1883) gave 104 paintings to the town between 1863 and 1878.
When he died, 140 works from his collection were bequeathed on condition that they were assembled in a museum.
The municipality charged the architect François Pelaz with converting the former granary at the entrance to the town into the new museum.
The people of Chambéry had been invited to talk about the annexation of Savoy to France (1860 Treaty of Turin) on the ground floor of this building.
The library was inaugurated on 14 July 1889 to celebrate the 100th anniversary of the founding of the department in the French Revolution.

History

From this starting point, the municipality continued to collect and safeguard works of art.
In 1905 it bought the domain of Charmettes, the childhood home of Jean-Jacques Rousseau.
In 1911 the Musée Savoisien was established in the buildings of the bishop's palace, awarded to the city following the law of separation of Church and State.
In 1958 some work was undertaken by the conservator Pierre Amiet.
The library was relocated in 1992 to make more space for exhibiting the collections, but the building had deteriorated over the years.
The municipality decided to renovate the museum, with the work completed by the start of 2012.
The cost was mostly covered by the town with some funding from the state.
The renovated museum was open in March 2012, and officially opened on 23 November 2012.

Today

The collections are mainly focused on classical Italian painting from the 14th to 18th centuries.
They include an outstanding altarpiece of the Trinity by Bartolo di Fredi, a Sienese artist of the fourteenth century.
There is also a good presentation of trends in Mannerism, the school of Caravaggio and Baroque.
Art from Florence predominates, including the triptych of the Passion by Domenico di Michelino and the famous Portrait of a young man by Paolo Uccello, as well as several works by Santi di Tito and Ghirlandaio. The Venetian, Neapolitan and Bolognese schools are also represented.
The museum has one of the richest collections in France of Italian works from schools such as Venice, Florence, Naples and Siena, which may be explained by the history of Savoy, lying between France and Italy.
There is also a good collection of classical French works and some mountain landscapes of the 19th century.
There is a large open space for temporary exhibitions.

References
Citations

Sources

Museums in Savoie
Chambéry
Buildings and structures in Chambéry